Thoughts for the Time of War and Death is a set of twin essays written by Sigmund Freud in 1915, six months after the outbreak of World War I. The essays express discontent and disillusionment with human nature and human society in the aftermath of the hostilities; and generated much interest among lay readers of Freud.

Disillusionment
The first essay addressed the widespread disillusionment brought on by the collapse of the Pax Britannica of the preceding century — what Freud called "the common civilization of peacetime."

Discounting death
The second essay addressed what Freud called the peacetime 'protection racket' whereby the inevitability of death was expunged from civilized mentality. Building on the second essay of Totem and Taboo, Freud argued that such an attitude left civilians in particular unprepared for the stark horror of industrial-scale death in the Great War.

Influence
Freud's account of the centrality of loss in culture has been seen as seminal for his later work, Civilization and its Discontents.

See also
Death drive
Goodbye to All That
Homo homini lupus

References

Further reading
 
 Robert Wohl, The Generation of 1914 (1979)

External links
 
 A copy of the text
 Library of Congress exhibit of the original Manuscript

1915 essays
Essays by Sigmund Freud